"Eye Know" is a 1989 single from De La Soul's debut album 3 Feet High and Rising. It peaked at number 14 on the UK singles chart.  It was not released as a single in the United States.

The song is an upbeat love song featuring guitar and horn samples from The Mad Lads' "Make This Young Lady Mine",  whistle sample from Otis Redding's "(Sittin' On) The Dock of the Bay", guitar, keyboard and vocal samples from Steely Dan's "Peg" and drums from Lee Dorsey's "Get Out of My Life, Woman".

This song was used on Match of the Day 2 as background music during the showing of Saturday's goals from 2004 to 2008.

Track listing
 "Eye Know (The Know It All Mix)"
 "Eye Know (The Kiss Mix)"
 "The Mack Daddy on the Left"
Guest Appearance: Chi Ali

1989 singles
Songs written by Vincent Mason
Songs written by Kelvin Mercer
Songs written by David Jude Jolicoeur
Songs written by Prince Paul (producer)
De La Soul songs
Song recordings produced by Prince Paul (producer)
1988 songs
Tommy Boy Records singles
UK Independent Singles Chart number-one singles
Steely Dan